SBS Aircraft was an aviation company based in Kazakhstan. It ceased operations in 2001.

Code data
IATA Code: XE
ICAO Code: ALT
Callsign: Green Craft

Defunct airlines of Kazakhstan
Airlines disestablished in 2001